Mirosław Handke (19 March 1946 – 22 April 2021) was a Polish chemist and politician, who served as Minister of Education from 1997 to 2000.

Early life 
Mirosław Handke was born on 19 March 1946 in Leszno.

Handke attended Jagiellonian University.

Career 
Handke was the Minister of National Education from 1997 to 2000.

Handke was the architect of the 1999 education reform.

References 

1946 births
2021 deaths
People from Leszno
20th-century Polish politicians
Solidarity Electoral Action politicians
Education ministers of Poland
Polish chemists
Jagiellonian University alumni